Piotr Trzaskalski (born February 5, 1964, in Łódź, Poland) is a Polish film director and screenwriter.

Biography
A graduate of the National Film School in Łódź. He is probably best known for his film Edi (2002), which won several awards at the Berlin International Film Festival (2003) in Berlin, Germany, and also won the special Audience Award at the 2003 Polish Film Awards from the Polish Academy. In 2004, he became a member of the European Film Academy.

His later film Mistrz (English:  The Master) (2005) won the FIPRESCI Prize at the Miami International Film Festival (2006) in Miami, Florida.

Selected filmography
 2002: Edi
 2005: The Master (Mistrz)
 2005: Długopis w Solidarność, Solidarność...
 2012: My Father's Bike

References

External links 
 
 Piotr Trzaskalski at the Filmpolski.pl 

1964 births
Living people
Polish film directors
Polish screenwriters
Film people from Łódź
University of Łódź alumni